Vangara is a village in Vangara Mandal in Vizianagaram district of the Indian state of Andhra Pradesh. It is located in Vangara mandal of Palakonda revenue division.

Demographics 
Telugu is spoken here. The population is 1,653—824 males and 829 females in 355 dwellings.

References 

Villages in Srikakulam district
Mandal headquarters in Srikakulam district